Franca Visalta (1170–1218), also known as Franca of Piacenza, was a Cistercian abbess.

Born in Piacenza, Italy, she became a Benedictine nun in St Syrus Convent at the age of seven and became abbess at a young age. However, she was removed and isolated because of the severe austerities she imposed. Only one nun, Carentia, agreed with Franca's discipline and she moved to a Cistercian convent in Rapallo.

Franca then persuaded her parents to build a Cistercian house in Montelana where she and Carentia both entered. Franca became abbess and maintained the strict austerities on herself, even when her health was failing, and spent most nights praying for several hours in chapel. She later moved the Cistercian community to Pittoli, where she died in 1218. Franca was canonised by Pope Gregory X.

References

Bibliography 
 Alban Butler (revised by Peter Doyle, ed. Paul Burns), Butler's Lives of the Saints:  April new full edition (Tunbridge Wells, Kent, England: Burns and Oates 1999), p. 185.
 Acta Sanctorum  Month of April Part 3,  April 25, pp. 379–404..

1170 births
1218 deaths
Benedictine nuns
Cistercian nuns
People from Piacenza
13th-century Italian women
13th-century Christian saints
Christian female saints of the Middle Ages